In differential geometry, a smooth surface in three dimensions has a ridge point when a line of curvature has a local maximum or minimum of principal curvature. The set of ridge points form curves on the surface called ridges.

The ridges of a given surface fall into two families, typically designated red and blue, depending on which of the two principal curvatures has an extremum.

At umbilical points the colour of a ridge will change from red to blue. There are two main cases: one has three ridge lines passing through the umbilic, and the other has one line passing through it.

Ridge lines correspond to cuspidal edges on the focal surface.

See also
Ridge detection

References

Differential geometry of surfaces
Surfaces